Thomas Corsan Morton (1859–1928) was a Scottish artist, known as one of the Glasgow Boys.

Life

Born in Glasgow, Morton worked briefly in a lawyer's office, and went to the city's School of Art. After a period at the Slade School in London, he studied in Paris under Gustave Boulanger and Jules Joseph Lefebvre. He exhibited widely in the UK and beyond, often in exhibitions with work by other members of the Glasgow School, including Secessionist exhibitions in Munich in the 1890s.

Morton was primarily a landscape artist. Some of his work came from summer painting trips with others of the "Boys". These included stays in Kirkcudbright and in Cockburnspath, James Guthrie's home, in the 1880s.

He taught landscape painting at the Glasgow School of Art, and assisted Francis Newbery with the life drawing classes.

His first one-man-show was organised in November 1894 at the gallery of Alexander Reid at 124 St Vincent Street in central Glasgow.

In May 1908, he was appointed Keeper of the Scottish National Gallery in Edinburgh. He moved to 7 Comiston Road in the south of the city. After retiring from that post in 1925 he became Curator of the newly established Art Gallery in Kirkcaldy, where he died in December 1928.

He is buried in the Dean Cemetery, Edinburgh with his wife Amelie Robertson (1869-1942), whom he had married in 1890, and their daughter Mildred Bruce Tupman (d.1972). The grave lies to the north of the southern path, near to that of Henry Snell Gamley.

Known Works

Road at Bridge of Allan (1917)
Woods in Autumn
James Morton, MD, President of the Royal College of Physicians and Surgeons of Glasgow
Souvenir de Manet Kelvingrove Art Gallery
Sunny Woodlands Kirkcaldy Art Gallery
Landscape with Cattle Kirkcaldy Art Gallery
Jean Armour Burns, Burns MuseumA Cathedral City - DurhamThe Wood-Cutter (1887)Daffodils (1888)Still Life: Roses and OrangesStill Life with ForsythiaReferences

Roger Billcliffe, The Glasgow Boys'', Frances Lincoln 2008
'Career and Influence', The Scotsman, Dec 26, 1928
Who's Who in Glasgow 1909
Biographical note - Whistler correspondence

19th-century Scottish painters
Scottish male painters
20th-century Scottish painters
1859 births
1928 deaths
19th-century Scottish male artists
20th-century Scottish male artists